The following article is a summary of the 2016–17 football season in France, which was the 83rd season of competitive football in the country and ran from July 2016 to June 2017.

League tables

Ligue 1

Ligue 2

Championnat National

Championnat de France Amateur

References

 
Seasons in French football